The energy functional is the total energy of a certain system, as a functional of the system's state.

In the energy methods of simulating the dynamics of complex structures, a state of the system is often described as an element of an appropriate function space. To be in this state, the system pays a certain cost in terms of energy required by the state. This energy is a scalar quantity, a function of the state, hence the term functional. The system tends to develop from the state with higher energy (higher cost) to the state with lower energy, thus local minima of this functional are usually related to the stable stationary states. Studying such states is part of the optimization problems, where the terms energy functional or cost functional are often used to describe the objective function.

Examples
 In Hamiltonian systems, the energy functional is given by the Hamiltonian.

See also
 Action (physics)
 Density functional theory
 Hamilton's principle
 History of variational principles in physics
 Potential well

External links
 Energy methods in elasticity, Wikiversity.

Energy (physics)